is a junction passenger railway station located in the city of Himeji, Hyōgo Prefecture, Japan, operated by the private Sanyo Electric Railway.

Lines

Station layout
The station consists of one ground-level bay platform serving three tracks. The Main Line trains use the outside platforms, and the Aboshi Line trains use the middle, dead-headed portion. The station entrance is located southwest of the platforms, and is connected to the platforms through a footbridge. The station is unattended.

Platforms

Adjacent stations

History
It was renamed  on 16 January 1924. The Aboshi Line started operations on 15 October 1940. It was renamed to its present name on 7 April 1991.

Passenger statistics
In fiscal 2018, the station was used by an average of 4791 passengers daily (boarding passengers only).

Surrounding area
Sanyo Electric Railway Kazuma Garage.
 Ebisu Tenmangu
 Hamanomiya Tenmangu
Japan National Route 250

See also
List of railway stations in Japan

References

External links

  Official website (Sanyo Electric Railway) 

Railway stations in Japan opened in 1923
Railway stations in Himeji